Lawrence W. Peace (February 13, 1917 - January 12, 2009) was an American football halfback who played one season with the Brooklyn Dodgers of the National Football League. He played college football at the University of Pittsburgh and attended Bradford Area High School in Bradford, Pennsylvania.

References

External links
Just Sports Stats

1917 births
2009 deaths
Players of American football from Pennsylvania
American football halfbacks
Pittsburgh Panthers football players
Brooklyn Dodgers (NFL) players
People from Bradford, Pennsylvania